Giovanni Battista Brughi (1660 – 1730) was an Italian painter and mosaic artist of the late-Baroque period.

Biography
He was born in Genoa, and pupil of Giovanni Battista Gaulli in Rome. He abandoned painting to become a mosaic artist.

References

1660 births
1730 deaths
17th-century Italian painters
Italian male painters
18th-century Italian painters
Italian Baroque painters
Umbrian painters
18th-century Italian male artists